Gallatin is a city in Cherokee County, Texas, in the United States, with a 2020 U.S. census-tabulated population of 321.

History
The area was first settled in the late 1840s, but a community did not develop until 1902, when the Texas and New Orleans Railroad (T&NO) was built through the area. John W. Chandler and his sister, Sophronia, who owned the surrounding land, asked Rusk attorney C. H. Martin to survey a townsite. Chandler named the new town Gallatin, after his hometown of Gallatin, Tennessee (which in turn had been named for Albert Gallatin). The new community, located in a large truck-farming area, quickly developed into a market for tomatoes and other produce. The construction in 1907 of a branch line of the T&NO between Gallatin and Rusk further enhanced the town as a shipping center.

By 1914 Gallatin had a population of 350, several churches, two general stores, a drugstore, a school, and a cotton gin. In 1916, virtually the entire business district was destroyed by fire, but the town was quickly rebuilt, and as late as the mid-1930s it reported 500 residents and five businesses.

After World War II, the community steadily declined. Its school was consolidated with the Rusk schools in the 1950s, and many of the town's businesses closed. The population fell to 350 by the early 1950s, and in 1990 only 171 residents and two stores were reported there. Nevertheless, Gallatin was incorporated in the early 1980s. In 1991, it had an estimated population of 382 and three businesses. In 2000, the population was 378 with four businesses.

Geography

Gallatin is located at  (31.903316, −95.150520).

Demographics

At the 2010 United States census, the population was 419. In 2020, its population declined to 321, down from the first record high in 2010.

The racial and ethnic makeup of the city was predominantly non-Hispanic white, and the median household income was $65,673 with a mean income of $68,133.

Education
Most of the city of Gallatin is served by the Rusk Independent School District.A small portion of the town is also within the Jacksonville ISD.

Notable people

 Johnny Horton, singer-songwriter, who graduated from the high school at Gallatin before going on to Lon Morris College in Jacksonville, Texas

References

Cities in Cherokee County, Texas
Cities in Texas